Lake Camelot is a census-designated place in Peoria County, Illinois, United States. Its population was 1,798 as of the 2020 census.

Lake Camelot was developed in 1969 and consists of 640 acres.  There are now approximately 618 homes.

There are two lakes, Lake Camelot and Lake Lancelot, which are stocked with a variety of fish and have boat ramps and docks available.  The clubhouse complex comprises three pools and a beach that are open from Memorial Day to Labor Day each year to members and their guests.

It is named after Camelot, the castle and court from Arthurian legends.

Demographics

References

Census-designated places in Peoria County, Illinois
Census-designated places in Illinois
Neighborhoods in Illinois